The list of ship commissionings in 1990 includes a chronological list of all ships commissioned in 1990.


See also 

1990
 Ship commissionings